Christopher Cropper Hood  (born 1947) is a visiting Professor of the Blavatnik School of Government at the University of Oxford, and an Emeritus Fellow of All Souls College, Oxford. Hood was Gladstone Professor of Government at All Souls College, Oxford, from 2001 to 2014, and Director of the ESRC Research Programme Public Services: Quality, Performance and Delivery from 2004 to 2010. His books include The Limits of Administration (1976), The Tools of Government (1983) (updated as The Tools of Government in the Digital Age (2007) with Helen Margetts), The Art of the State (1998 and 2000) and A Government that Worked Better and Cost Less? (2015, with Ruth Dixon). He chaired the Nuffield Council on Bioethics' Working Party on medical profiling and online medicine from 2008 to 2010.

He specialises in the study of executive government, regulation and public-sector reform and has written on New Public Management.

Education
Hood obtained a B.A. degree (first-class honours) in Social Sciences from the University of York in 1968, and a B.Litt. degree from the University of Glasgow in 1971. He was awarded a D.Litt. degree from the University of York in 1987.

Awards 
The Art of the State was awarded the 1998 W. J. M. Mackenzie award of the Political Studies Association. He was appointed Commander of the Order of the British Empire (CBE) in the 2011 Birthday Honours. A Government that Worked Better and Cost Less? was awarded the 2015 Louis Brownlow Book Award of the National Academy of Public Administration and the 2016 W. J. M. Mackenzie award. In 2017, Hood was awarded an honorary doctorate (Dr.h.c.) from the Erasmus University Rotterdam, "for his contribution to the development of the field of Public Administration in general and in the Netherlands in particular".

Selected bibliography

References

External links
 Home page
 Reshaping Executive Government
 Explorations in Governance

Living people
Fellows of All Souls College, Oxford
Fellows of the British Academy
1947 births
Gladstone Professors of Government
Commanders of the Order of the British Empire